Triconolestes is an extinct genus of Late Jurassic eutriconodont mammal from the Morrison Formation, present in stratigraphic zones 4. Known from only a single molar, it is a small mammal typically considered an amphilestid. However, it has also been compared to Argentoconodon, which has been considered a volaticothere related to gliding mammals such as Volaticotherium and Ichthyoconodon.

See also
 List of prehistoric mammals
 Paleobiota of the Morrison Formation

References

 Foster, J. (2007). Jurassic West: The Dinosaurs of the Morrison Formation and Their World. Indiana University Press. 389pp.

Eutriconodonts
Morrison mammals
Gliding animals
Fossil taxa described in 1998
Prehistoric mammal genera